Everett Ellis (January 12, 1897 – January 6, 1973) was an American athlete. He competed in the men's decathlon at the 1920 Summer Olympics.

References

External links
 

1897 births
1973 deaths
Athletes (track and field) at the 1920 Summer Olympics
American male decathletes
Olympic track and field athletes of the United States
Track and field athletes from Boston
Olympic decathletes